Principle value may refer to:

Principle value (ethics)
Cauchy principal value (mathematics)